The 1997–98 Valparaiso Crusaders men's basketball team represented Valparaiso University during the 1997–98 NCAA Division I men's basketball season. The Crusaders, led by tenth-year head coach Homer Drew, played their home games at the Athletics–Recreation Center as members of the Mid-Continent Conference. This season is one of the most memorable in program history as the Crusaders made a run to the Sweet Sixteen of the NCAA tournament. The opening round victory over Ole Miss is best known for "The Shot" that sparked the Crusaders' Cinderella run. The team finished with a record of 23–10 (13–3 Mid-Con).

Roster

Schedule and results

|-
!colspan=9 style=| Regular season
|-

|-
!colspan=12 style=| Mid-Con tournament

|-
!colspan=12 style=| NCAA tournament

Source

Rankings

1998 NBA draft

References

Valparaiso
Valparaiso Beacons men's basketball seasons
Valparaiso
Valparaiso Crusaders men's basketball
Valparaiso Crusaders men's basketball